Westwood is a rural locality in the local government area of Meander Valley in the Launceston region of Tasmania. The 2016 census determined a population of 63 for the state suburb of Westwood.

History
The area was originally known as Summershall. Westwood was gazetted as a locality in 1968.

Geography
The Meander River forms the south-western and southern boundaries, while the South Esk River forms most of the eastern boundary.

Road infrastructure
The C732 route (Bridgenorth Road / Westwood Road) enters from the north and exits to the south-west. The C738 route (a continuation of Westwood Road) starts at an intersection with C732 and runs to the south-east before exiting.

References

Localities of Meander Valley Council
Towns in Tasmania